C. K. Hareendran is the member of 14th Kerala Legislative Assembly. He represents Parassala constituency and belongs to Communist Party of India (Marxist). He is the CPI(M) Area secretary for Neyyattinkara.

References

Living people
Politicians from Thiruvananthapuram
Kerala MLAs 2016–2021
Communist Party of India (Marxist) politicians from Kerala
Year of birth missing (living people)